Tempo Presente (Italian: Present Time) was a monthly political magazine which existed between 1956 and 1967 in Rome, Italy. It was supported by the Congress for Cultural Freedom which published other magazines, including Cuadernos, Encounter, Survey and Der Monat.

History and profile
Tempo Presente was established in 1956 and published monthly in Rome by the Italian Association for Cultural Freedom. The Association was the Italian division of the Congress for Cultural Freedom. The first issue of Tempo Presente  appeared in April 1956.

The editors were Ignazio Silone and Nicola Chiaromonte. The magazine featured articles published in other Congress magazines, including Cuadernos, Encounter, Der Monat and Preuves. They all covered significant cultural and political events which were used to show the superiority of Western-style democracy over other alternatives of government. However, each of these magazines had their own specific political stance mostly depending on the editors, and Tempo Presente adopted a left-wing approach. 

The major contributors of the monthly were leftist writers who did not support Communism: Italo Calvino, Vasco Pratolini, Libero de Libero, Albert Camus, Alberto Moravia, Leonardo Sciascia, Enzo Forcella, Nelo Risi, Elsa Morante, Altiero Spinelli, Giulio Guderzo, Giuliano Piccoli and Luciano Codignola. Some well-known international writers also contributed to Tempo Presente, including Dwight Macdonald, Hannah Arendt, Melvin J. Lasky, Richard Löwenthal, Mary McCarty, Daniel Bell, Lewis A. Coser, Joseph Buttinger, Michael Harrington, Irving Howe and Theodore Draper. The magazine folded in 1967 due to the low levels of circulation.

References

External links

1956 establishments in Italy
1967 disestablishments in Italy
CIA activities in Italy
Congress for Cultural Freedom
Defunct political magazines published in Italy
Italian-language magazines
Magazines established in 1956
Magazines disestablished in 1967
Magazines published in Rome
Monthly magazines published in Italy
Propaganda newspapers and magazines
Cold War propaganda